The Division of Watson was an Australian Electoral Division in the state of New South Wales. It was located in the inner southern suburbs of Sydney, and originally included the suburbs of Coogee, Kensington and Maroubra. By the time it was abolished in 1968, it covered the suburbs of Banksmeadow, Mascot and Redfern.

The Division was named after Hon Chris Watson, the first Labor Prime Minister of Australia. It replaced his old seat of South Sydney, and was proclaimed at the redistribution of 1 August 1934. It was abolished at the redistribution of 21 November 1968.

After the redistribution of 31 January 1992, the Division of St George was abolished, and a new Division of Watson was created. That Division is not connected to this one, except in name.

Members

Election results

See also
 Division of Watson

1934 establishments in Australia
Constituencies established in 1934
1969 disestablishments in Australia
Constituencies disestablished in 1969
Watson (1934-69)